This is a summary of the highest scoring matches and biggest winning margins in the Iraqi Premier League since its establishment in the 1974–75 season.

Highest scoring games

Biggest winning margin

References

Iraqi Premier League
Highest-scoring association football matches